is an adult Japanese visual novel written by Tomohiro Minakami and developed by Digital Object. It was released in Japan for Windows on September 28, 2001. A 'Full Voice Version' of the game was released in Japan on July 25, 2003, including full voice acting (apart from the protagonist) and extended scenarios for each character. The voice assets from this version of the game, but not the extended scenarios, were utilized by G-Collections in their English translation of the game, which was released on October 20, 2003. A reprint version was released in Japan on March 4, 2005 and a Russian version was produced by Macho Studio in 2007.

The game follows a student named Ryo Sasaki through the five days leading up to his high school graduation. The story is presented as text, laid over graphics of the player's current location and other characters who are present. The player progresses through the story and is occasionally presented with decisions that determine the path the game will take.

Crescendo is told from a third person perspective. This allows the game to shift to other characters' viewpoints from time to time. Most of the game is played from Ryo's point of view, though. Crescendo is a unique visual novel in that none of the background music used within the game were composed by Yoshio Tsuru for the purpose of the game; instead, it uses various famous songs, pieces, and folk songs (and rearrangements thereof) as its background music, tying the motif of music more closely into the game.

This game also includes an in-universe nod to characters from an earlier Digital Object game Kana: Little Sister, where the player can watch a movie based on the lives of the characters from that game.

Plot
Ryo was adopted by the Sasaki family as a baby, much to the delight of his new adoptive sister, Ayame. His new parents chose not to tell him that he was adopted, however, and he didn't discover this fact until his teens. Ryo's life was shortly dealt another blow when his adoptive parents were killed in a car accident. Ayame abandoned her nursing studies in order to get a job and support Ryo through high school. One of the first people Ryo met at high school was Kaho Nagira. She begged him to join the literature club, which was in danger of being closed due to low membership. Surprising even himself, Ryo agreed to join, and he and Kaho became friends. Ryo found it difficult to settle into life at his new school, and sometimes had run-ins with other students. It was in the aftermath of one of these fights that he met the school nurse, Kaori Shito, and the two struck up an unlikely friendship. Throughout his time at high school, Ryo often visited her office in order to take naps and skip class, or simply to talk with her.

In Ryo's third year of high school, Kyoko Ashihara joined the literature club. She was a first-year student and a friend of Kaho's. Ryo found himself touched by Kyoko's plight—living by herself, apart from both of her parents—and did his best to be kind to her. Ryo has a low opinion of Yuka Otowa. She is looked down upon at the school because she prostitutes herself to other students. However, at the same time, Ryo has found himself defending her to other people and helping her in times of crisis, though he doesn't understand why he bothers. Although Ryo once said he hated Yuka for what she does, his hatred slowly disappears soon after. Tomonori Sugimura is Ryo's best friend at high school. After he met Kaho at the school festival, he asked Ryo to introduce the two of them properly, hoping to develop a relationship with her. Ryo did so, despite his own interest in Kaho. Tomonori and Kaho started dating shortly thereafter. Miyu Shizuhara is a friend of Kaho's who Ryo met when he heard her playing the piano in the music room. Miyu quickly warmed to him, and they soon became friends.

Characters
Ryo Sasaki
A student in his third year of high school. He is the main protagonist of the game.

Kaho Nagira

A cheerful girl who is Ryo's classmate. She is president of the school's literature club, and enjoys reading. She is dating Ryo's friend Tomonori.

Kyoko Ashihara

A first-year high school student who tends to fall asleep easily. She is much taller than most girls her age, and feels very self-conscious about that fact. She and Kaho have been close friends since grade school.

Yuka Otowa

Another third-year student at Ryo's high school. She is a prostitute, selling her services to other students for fifty dollars per session. She has a bright, seemingly carefree personality. She is the hooker with a heart of gold.

Ayame Sasaki

Ryo's older (adopted) sister. She has dedicated her life to Ryo since their parents were killed, sometimes to her own detriment. She and Ryo have an affectionate, if somewhat troubled, relationship.

Kaori Shito

The school nurse. Kaori attended the same nursing school as Ayame. Kaori has a cynical, no-nonsense attitude to life, which many students interpret as a cold nature. Ryo, who has visited her often during his high school years, has seen through this and has a different opinion of her.

Tomonori Sugimura

Ryo's best friend. The captain of the school's basketball team. He is also very popular with girls, but never had eyes for anyone until he met Kaho during a school festival.

Miyu Shizuhara

Another third-year student. She is a talented pianist, and hopes to become a concert performer one day. She has a frail constitution and is often sick. Because of this, Miyu's only friends are Kaho and Ryo.

References

External links
Official website 
English translation official website

2001 video games
Bishōjo games
Eroge
Video games developed in Japan
Video games scored by Yoshio Tsuru
Visual novels
Windows games
Windows-only games